The Cuckoo Cars Driving School (originally opened as Peugeot 207 Driving School) is a ride at Alton Towers for young children. It is styled as a mock driving institution where young children learn how to drive small cars. Riders are allowed to drive around a miniature course, where they are overseen by marshals. The track is mainly built and themed around the area, Cloud Cuckoo Land. It is decorated with colourful statues and quirky scenery.

History 

The attraction was opened in July 2006 as the Peugeot 207 Driving School, with riders driving around in vehicles modelled after the Peugeot 207, however this was renamed simply to the Peugeot Driving School in 2010. Later, in 2012, the ride's sponsorship deal with Peugeot came to an end, with the attraction being given a new name of simply the Alton Towers Driving School. At this time, all Peugeot branding was removed from the ride, however the cars remained modelled vaguely after the Peugeot 207. Finally, in 2017, after a one year renovation period from the 2016 season, the ride received a minor refurbishment and reopened as the Cuckoo Cars Driving School, with cars receiving an updated, patterned shell.

Reception 

When opened in 2006, the Peugeot 207 Driving School was immensely popular with children. The appeal of allowing them to drive openly was a first at Alton Towers. A marketing ploy was that the children received a faux driver's license after completing their 5-minute turn.

References

Alton Towers
Amusement rides introduced in 2006
Driver's education